Jean-Michel Boucheron (born 15 December 1946 in Angoulême, Charente) is a French politician, formerly a member of the National Assembly of France (1978-1988 mayor of Angoulême and briefly Secretary of State for Local Authorities.  He represented Charente's 4th constituency in the Assembly, and is a member of the Socialist Party.

References

1946 births
Living people
People from Angoulême
Politicians from Nouvelle-Aquitaine
Socialist Party (France) politicians
Secretaries of State of France
Deputies of the 6th National Assembly of the French Fifth Republic
Deputies of the 7th National Assembly of the French Fifth Republic
Deputies of the 8th National Assembly of the French Fifth Republic
Deputies of the 9th National Assembly of the French Fifth Republic
Mayors of places in Nouvelle-Aquitaine